Hnialum Lalruatfeli (born 15 July 1996) is an Indian women's hockey player. She was a part of India at the 2016 South Asian Games and the reserve member for the team at 2016 Summer Olympics. She is in reserve athletes in case of injury.

References

External links 
 
 Wrong turn to right spot - Mizo girl in golden team

Indian female field hockey players
Living people
1996 births
Sportswomen from Mizoram
Field hockey players from Mizoram
Olympic field hockey players of India
South Asian Games gold medalists for India
South Asian Games medalists in field hockey
21st-century Indian women
21st-century Indian people